A   train ticket is a transit pass ticket issued by a railway operator that enables the bearer to travel on the operator's network or a partner's network. Tickets can authorize the bearer to travel a set itinerary at a specific time (common for long-distance railroads), a set itinerary at any time (common for commuter railroads), a set itinerary at multiple times, or an arbitrary itinerary at specific times. The last two categories are often called passes: the former is often sold as a discounted block of trips for commuters; the latter is often sold to vacationers, such as European Eurail passes.

In some countries, like Italy, and some local railways in Germany, conductors are not used. Instead passengers are expected to validate tickets in a special stamping machine before entering the train. A system of coupons that are validated with a special machine exists on the Mumbai Suburban Railway where combinations of coupons of denominations are used to get the corresponding ticket value. There may or may not be a conductor later on double-checking that correct tickets are actually held. Yet further systems are possible, for example in Japan, the London Underground and in local traffic in Stockholm, the platforms are blocked by turnstiles, forcing the acquisition of a ticket before entering the platform.

Some train tickets are available with an option to add bus travel at either end of the train ticketed journey, as part of a wider transport network. For instance, the Plusbus scheme in the United Kingdom offers bus travel on an integrated ticket for an additional fee. In Germany, most long-distance train tickets include a "city ticket" valid on the public transit system of origin and destination. This is automatically included at no extra charge in all tickets purchased by BahnCard holders and is indicated on the ticket.

History
Early tickets were similar to a form of currency issued by individual railroads, sold by agents and collected by conductors who were audited by the railroad to be sure ticket inventories matched reported passenger earnings. As continuous travel over several connected railways became common, Coupon tickets with serrated portions for each railway company might be issued at the origin of travel and sequentially collected by conductors of the railways providing travel to avoid the necessity for purchasing additional tickets at each transfer point.

Seat checks

In the US, a conductor may also provide the passenger with a seat check — another voucher indicating how far the passenger may travel on the system — or attach it over the seat also punched by the conductor showing the passenger's destination, along with conductors organizing train seating by destination during boarding. Some systems (Amtrak, for instance) have two-part tickets that permit the passenger to retain a cancelled ticket stub; others (the New Jersey Transit and Massachusetts Bay Transportation Authority commuter rail systems, for instance) do not. Seat checks are changed frequently to ensure that passengers cannot retain and reuse them from journey to journey. (Conductors typically collect checks before stops to prevent this.)

Electronic ticketing
Increasingly, electronic tickets are being used as replacements for paper tickets. Amtrak, as of June 30, 2012 offers electronic tickets on all train routes which have QR codes to identify the ticket's validity and can be printed out or shown to a conductor on a smartphone or Apple Watch screen. Similar systems are used by Eurostar, Chiltern Railways and Great Western Railway in the UK.

In India, an SMS sent by the Indian Railways, along with a valid proof of identity is considered equivalent to a ticket.

Gallery

See also

 CIV (rail travel), European train rules
 Edmondson railway ticket, format of printed ticket
 National Rail Conditions of Travel, UK
 Rail pass
 Reservation against Cancellation, India

References

Further reading
 Dobrzynski, Jan. British railway tickets (Bloomsbury, 2013).

 Fairchild, Gordon. Local Tickets of Global Lands (Barteld Publishing 2008), 

Fare collection systems
Tickets